Disciples Seminary Foundation is a 501(c)3 charitable organization affiliated with the Christian Church (Disciples of Christ) and located near the campus of Claremont School of Theology in Claremont, California. It also has partnerships with Pacific School of Religion, San Francisco Theological Seminary, and Seattle University's School of Theology and Ministry. The foundation cultivates church leadership by providing scholarships to seminary and graduate students for theological education. Its assets total $15,221,980.

References

External links
Official website

Christian Church (Disciples of Christ)
Christian charities based in the United States
Charities based in California